The Rosario River is a river located in the Colonia Department of Uruguay. Its originates in Cuchilla Grande Inferior, near the limit with the departments of San José, Flores, and Soriano, and flows into the Río de la Plata.

References

Rivers of Uruguay
Río de la Plata
Rivers of Colonia Department